Dimeling Hotel is a historic hotel located in Clearfield, Pennsylvania, United States. The seven-story, 120-room hotel, located across from the Clearfield County Courthouse, was designed by Louis Beezer and Michael J. Beezer of Beezer Brothers, a Pittsburgh-based architectural firm, and constructed in 1904–1905. The hotel ceased operating in 1977.  The community came together to save this landmark, and in 1998 investors agreed to buy the building (for $1) and turn it into senior living apartments.  Building rehab took nearly two years.  Dimeling Senior Residence opened doors in 1999.

The building was listed on the National Register of Historic Places on April 10, 1980.

See also
National Register of Historic Places listings in Clearfield County, Pennsylvania

References

External links

Hotels in Pennsylvania
Hotel buildings on the National Register of Historic Places in Pennsylvania
Historic American Buildings Survey in Pennsylvania
Buildings and structures in Clearfield County, Pennsylvania
Hotel buildings completed in 1905
National Register of Historic Places in Clearfield County, Pennsylvania
1905 establishments in Pennsylvania